Angel Antonio Cuan Hernández (born May 29, 1989) is a minor league baseball pitcher who is a free agent. He has also played for Panama in international competition, including the 2009 World Baseball Classic.

Minor league baseball
He began his professional career in 2008 with the VSL Mets, going 1–8 with a 3.12 ERA in 14 games started. In 72 innings, he had 74 strikeouts. He began the 2009 season with the Brooklyn Cyclones and also pitched for the Kingsport Mets, going 1–5 with a 5.05 ERA in 14 games (13 starts) that year. In 2010, he pitched for the Cyclones and St. Lucie Mets, going a combined 5–1 with a 1.93 ERA in 17 games (14 starts).

International competition
He had a 4.05 ERA in three relief appearances in the 2008 Americas Baseball Cup. He appeared in one game in the 2009 World Baseball Classic, posting a 27.00 in 1/3 inning of work.

References

Living people
1989 births
2009 World Baseball Classic players
Brooklyn Cyclones players
Kingsport Mets players
St. Lucie Mets players
Savannah Sand Gnats players
Binghamton Mets players
Venezuelan Summer League Mets players
Panamanian expatriate baseball players in Venezuela
Panamanian expatriate baseball players in the United States